"3-2-1" is a song recorded by Canadian country music artist Brett Kissel. It was released in February 2014 as the third single from his major label debut album, Started with a Song. Kissel wrote the song with Marv Green and Tim Nichols.

Music video
The music video was directed by Shaun Silva and released on February 24, 2014. It reached number one on the CMT Chevy Top 20 Countdown and won the Canadian Country Music Association award for CMT Video of the Year.

Chart performance
"3-2-1" debuted at No. 31 on the Billboard Canada Country chart and peaked No. 3.

Certifications

References

2013 songs
2014 singles
Brett Kissel songs
Warner Music Group singles
Songs written by Brett Kissel
Songs written by Marv Green
Songs written by Tim Nichols
Music videos directed by Shaun Silva
Canadian Country Music Association Video of the Year videos